Azard (Russian: Азард) was one of eight s built for the Russian Imperial Navy during World War I. Completed in 1916, she served with the Baltic Fleet and joined the Bolshevik Red Fleet after the October Revolution of 1918. She was active during the Russian Civil War, taking part in several engagements against British ships during the British campaign in the Baltic. The destroyer was renamed Zinoviev (Russian: Зиновьев) in 1922 and Artem (Russian: Aртёm) in 1928. She remained in service with the Soviet Baltic Fleet when Germany invaded the Soviet Union in 1941, and was sunk by a mine on 28 August.

Design and construction
In 1912, the Russian State Duma passed a shipbuilding programme for the Imperial Russian Navy that envisioned the construction of four battlecruisers, eight cruisers, 36 destroyers and 18 submarines, mainly for the Baltic Fleet. An order for 22 destroyers to Putilov's design was placed with the three shipyards in December 1912.

Displacement was  normal.

The ships were originally designed to carry an armament of two  guns and four triple  torpedo tubes, but during construction, the Russian Naval Staff decided to strengthen the gun armament, replacing one set of torpedo tubes with two more 102 mm guns. One  anti-aircraft gun was fitted, while 50 mines could be carried. The ships had a crew of 150. By the Second World War, Artem had lost one triple torpedo tube mount and the old 40 mm anti-aircraft gun, replacing them by two 45 mm and two 37 mm guns, which were backed up by three 12.7mm and nine 7.62mm machine guns. The ships crew had increased to 160.

Azard was laid down in July 1915, launched on 22 May 1916 (9 May 1916 Old Style) and commissioned on 10 October 1916 (27 September 1916 Old Style).

Service
Azard joined the 2nd Destroyer Division of the Baltic Fleet on commissioning, being employed on screening operations of the fleet, convoy escort and patrol. Azard sided with the Bolsheviks following the October Revolution, joining the Red Fleet. In March 1918, Germany intervened in the Finnish Civil War, landing a division of troops (the Baltic Sea Division) to reinforce the Finnish White forces. The advance of the Germans and White Finns soon threatened the port of Helsingfors (now Helsinki), where the Baltic Fleet was based. On 10 April 1918, the Bolsheviks managed to evacuate most of the Baltic Fleet, including Azard, to Kronstadt in the "Ice Cruise", despite much of the Baltic still being ice-bound.

Azard was active during the Russian Civil War, and from 4–24 December 1918 shelled German and Estonian forces near Aseri and Kunda in Estonia. Fyodor Raskolnikov, Commissar of the Baltic Fleet, planned an attack on British naval forces at Reval (now Tallinn) on 25 December, to be carried out by Azard and the destroyers Spartak and Avtroil, with the cruiser  and battleship  in distant support. Azard was out of fuel and Avtroil was suffering from mechanical problems, so Spartak attacked Reval alone on the morning of 26 December, but was caught by the British destroyers Vendetta,  and  while trying to retreat to Kronstadt. Spartak ran aground and surrendered to the British.

On 29 May 1919, Azard was escorting six minesweepers when she was unsuccessfully attacked by the British submarine . This encounter prompted the British to send a force of three light cruisers and six destroyers into the Gulf of Finland, arriving off Seskar on 30 May. On 31 May, Azard was again escorting minesweepers, with the battleship  as distant cover, when it encountered the British destroyer . Azard opened fire on Walker, but the remainder of the British force soon arrived on the scene, and Azard retreated towards Petropavlovsk and behind a minefield, with both the two Russian ships and coastal artillery maintaining fire on Walker until the British broke off the engagement, with Walker being hit twice with slight damage. A similar exchange of fire occurred on 4 June, between Gavriil and Azard on the Russian side and the destroyers , Vivacious and Walker, with Petropavlovsk providing distant support to the Russian destroyers. Shortly after this exchange of fire, the British submarine  attempted a torpedo attack against the two Russian destroyers, but broke surface after the attack and was hit by a shell from one of the destroyers. L55 attempted to dive away to safety but exploded and sank with the loss of all hands (probably after striking a mine). Gavriil, leading the destroyers, was the first to strike a mine at 05:48 and sank after twenty minutes. Konstantin and Svoboda were sunk by mines within minutes, with only Azard, at the rear of the formation, escaping unharmed. Only 25 men were rescued from the three lost destroyers.

The ship was renamed Zinoviev on 31 December 1922, and underwent a major refit in 1923. She was commanded by Gordey Levchenko, later to become an Admiral in the Soviet Navy, from April 1928 to May 1929. The ship was again renamed to Artem on 27 November 1928. Artem was refitted again in 1933.

Artem took part in the Winter War, the Soviet invasion of Finland in 1939–1940, shelling Finnish fortifications on islands in the Gulf of Finland in December 1939.

On 2 August 1941, Artem was unsuccessfully attacked by the German motor-torpedo boats S-55 and S-58 in the Gulf of Riga. On 21 August, Artem and  unsuccessfully attacked German transports in the Gulf of Riga. By August 1941, Tallinn was surrounded by German troops, with the Germans launching a final assault on the city on 19 August. The Soviet evacuation of Tallinn began on 27 August, with 190 ships being split between four convoys bound for Kronstadt, with Artem forming part of the covering force. On the night of 28/29 August, the convoys encountered dense minefields off Cape Juminda.

Notes

Citations

References

Further reading

Orfey-class destroyers
Destroyers of the Imperial Russian Navy
Ships built in Russia
1916 ships
World War I destroyers of Russia
Destroyers of the Soviet Navy